The wrestling tournament at the 1993 Mediterranean Games was held in Perpignan, France.

Medalists

Freestyle

Greco-Roman

Medals table

References

External links
List of Olympians who won medals at the Mediterranean Games at Olympedia.org

Medi
Wrestling
1991